Denton Edward Rebok (1897–1983) was a Seventh-day Adventist educator and administrator. Born in Pennsylvania, he served the denomination for 44 years. He spent 23 years as a missionary in China. While there he founded the China Training Institute, a junior college located in the town of Qiaotou in northern Jiangsu province, about 160 miles from Shanghai and 30 miles from Nanjing, in 1925. He taught at Washington Missionary College, La Sierra College, was president of Southern Missionary College also Dean of the Seventh-day Adventist Theological Seminary. He served briefly as chair of the Ellen G. White Estate board of trustees in 1952, and gave two presentations about Ellen G. White at the 1952 Bible Conference. He authored Believe His Prophets, an apologetic for the prophetic gift of Ellen White.

Legacy

After his death, the Rebok estate provided a gift to the Seventh-day Adventist Church; 70% of which helped establish a library at the church's world headquarters and 30% to Adventist World Radio - Asia, for an endowment fund.

The General Conference of Seventh-day Adventists' Rebok Memorial Library holds approximately 9,700 books, primarily from the 20th century although there are some earlier books. The Library has most Seventh-day Adventist publications in English from the United States and abroad as well as some Spanish-language publications.

Bibliography

Denton E. Rebok, "Divine Guidance in the Remnant of God's Church" (The Oriental Watchman Publishing House, 1955).
Herbert Ford, "For the Love of China: The Life Story of Denton E. Rebok" (Pacific Press, 1971).

See also 

 Seventh-day Adventist Church
 Seventh-day Adventist theology
 Seventh-day Adventist eschatology
 History of the Seventh-day Adventist Church
 Teachings of Ellen White
 Inspiration of Ellen White
 Prophecy in the Seventh-day Adventist Church
 Investigative judgment
 The Pillars of Adventism
 Second Advent
 Baptism by Immersion
 Conditional Immortality
 Historicism
 Three Angels' Messages
 End times
 Sabbath in Seventh-day Adventism
 Ellen G. White
 Adventist
 Seventh-day Adventist Church Pioneers
 Seventh-day Adventist worship

References

1897 births
1983 deaths
Seventh-day Adventist religious workers
Ellen G. White Estate
American Seventh-day Adventists
Andrews University faculty
Southern Adventist University
Heads of universities and colleges in the United States